There have been 12 coaches of the Newcastle Knights since their first season in 1988.

List of coaches

See also

List of current NRL coaches
List of current NRL Women's coaches

References

External links

National Rugby League lists
Lists of rugby league coaches
New South Wales-related lists